Ali Rezai is a neurosurgeon interested in advancing the use of brain chip implants in deep brain stimulation and neuromodulation to treat Parkinson's disease, obsessive–compulsive disorder, Alzheimer's disease and traumatic brain injury.

In 2014 Rezai was a member of a surgical team who implanted a chip developed by Battelle Research Institute to decode and transmit signals from the motor cortex of a patient's brain to bypass spinal injury and restore limb movement. Although the patient did not achieve functional use of the hand, the approach provided movement to his hand. This surgical procedure was purported to be a technological and breakthrough in neural engineering as the first ever account of "limb reanimation."

Rezai is the executive chairman and director of the Rockefeller Neuroscience Institute at West Virginia University. He is the former director of Ohio State University's Neurological Institute and the university's Stanley D. and Joan H. Ross Chair in Neuromodulation and professor of neurosurgery and neuroscience.

Deep Brain Stimulation Technology
For over a decade, the technology of deep brain stimulation has been applied to treat patients with Parkinson's disease and other movement disorders.

The safety and efficacy of deep brain stimulation is also being widely studied at the ventral capsule/ventral striatum region to specifically modulate frontal lobe behavioral and cognitive networks as a novel treatment approach for Alzheimer's disease patients.

On Nov. 1, 2019, Rezai was a member of a team that surgically implanted a deep brain stimulator chip into the nucleus accumbens part of the human brain to reduce human cravings for drugs, particularly opioids. This marked the first time that deep brain stimulation was performed in the United States for drug addiction. The procedure, approved by the US Food and Drug Administration, received funding from the National Institute on Drug Abuse. The patient, Gerod Buckhalter, age 33, was a drug abuser since age 15 and the first of four patients in this pilot program aimed at a small percentage of patients with treatment-resistant cravings for opioids. The operation was a first-in-the-US clinical trial using deep brain stimulation for patients with treatment-resistant opioid use disorder.

Innovations
On November 15, 2018, a team of approximately eight medical investigators at The Rockefeller Neuroscience Institute at West Virginia University conducted the nation's first phase III clinical trial using a tiny, pill-like micropellet implant made of a non-addictive, non-steroid medication that was placed into a patient's lower back to combat chronic pain caused from sciatica.

Research
 Alzheimer's disease: West Virginia University's Rockefeller Neuroscience Institute was chosen as one of several sites to conduct a multicenter, Phase II clinical trial using ultrasound technology to help reverse the effects of Alzheimer's disease, and allow doctors access to parts of the brain affected by it.
 Parkinson's disease: On May 3, 2016, at the Ohio State University Wexner Medical Center, Rezai and neurologist Dr. Punit Agarwal performed brain stimulation surgery using an electrical lead attached to a pacemaker to control tremors from Parkinson's disease.

Education
Rezai received an undergraduate degree from the University of California, Los Angeles, and graduated with honors from the University of Southern California's School of Medicine to earn his MD degree in 1990. He completed his subspecialty training in functional neurosurgery at the University of Toronto. In 1997, Rezai completed the residency program at New York University's School of Medicine.

Career
From 2011 to 2013, Rezai was president of the North American Neuromodulation Society. He is a past president of the Congress of Neurological Surgeons and the American Society of Stereotactic and Functional Neurosurgery. In September 2017, Rezai was appointed by West Virginia University and the Rockefeller family as the incoming director to lead neuroscience clinical studies and research for the new West Virginia University Rockefeller Neuroscience Institute.

Honors and awards
 Innovator of the Year Award, Cleveland Clinic, 2007
 Best Article of the Year Award, CNS Spectrums, 2004
 Best Paper of the Year, American Psychiatric Association, 2004
 American Association of Neurological Surgeons William H Sweet Investigator Award, 1998
 Congress of Neurological Surgeons Clinical Fellowship Award, 1997
 Bottrell Neurosurgical Award in Neurosurgery, 1997

Editorial Positions
 Editorial board of the journals Neurosurgery, World Neurosurgery, Stereotactic and Functional Neurosurgery, Neuromodulation and Neurological Research
 Co-editor, World Neurosurgery journal supplement, 2013
 Co-editor, Movement Disorders journal supplement, "Deep brain stimulation for Parkinson's disease", 2006
 Editor, Neurosurgery Clinics of North America: "Neurosurgery for Psychiatric Disorders", 2003

Professional Society Positions
 President, North American Neuromodulation Society, 2011–2013
 President, Congress of Neurological Surgeons, 2012–2013
 Past president, American Society of Stereotactic and Functional Neurosurgery, June 2010–June 2012
 Annual Meeting Scientific Program chairman, North American Neuromodulation Society Meeting, 2009–2011
 Annual Meeting Program chairman, Congress of Neurological Surgeons Annual Meeting, 2010
 Vice-president, American Society of Stereotactic and Functional Neurosurgery (2008–2010)
 Executive Committee, Congress of Neurological Surgeons, 2002–2013
 Board of Directors, North American Neuromodulation Society, 2004–2013
 Board of Directors, International Society of Reconstructive Neurosurgery, 2005–2013

Published Works
Rezai has published more than 175 peer-reviewed articles in peer reviewed journals, including Nature and Lancet Neurology. He serves on the editorial board of five scientific journals, including Neurosurgery.

Special Presentations
 "Brain Pacemakers" Presentation to the President of the United States, George W. Bush, July 10, 2007
 "Traumatic Brain Injury: Diagnosis and Treatment" Presentation on Capitol Hill to members of the United States Senate and House of Representatives, June 27, 2007
 "Deep Brain Stimulation." Presentation to Ohio Governor Ted Strickland. Cleveland Clinic, Cleveland, OH, February 7, 2008
 "Traumatic Brain Injury: Implications" Social Security Administration Hearing, Washington, D.C., November 18, 2008
 "Neurological Innovations." Presentation to Mayor of Cleveland, Frank G. Jackson, April 6, 2009
 "Neuromodulation Overview." Presentation to Ohio Governor John Kasich, Ohio State University Medical Center, Columbus, OH, December 2, 2011
 "Neuromodulation and chronic disease" Presentation to the Cabinet of the Governor of Ohio. Ohio Statehouse, Columbus, OH, January 20, 2012

References 

Year of birth missing (living people)
Living people
American neurosurgeons
University of California, Los Angeles alumni
University of Southern California alumni